The Independence Association of Puerto Rico (Asociación Independentista) was a political organization whose members favored Puerto Rican independence and which played an important role in the formation of the Puerto Rican Nationalist Party.

History

In 1920, Dr. Leopoldo Figueroa became disillusioned with the Union Party of Puerto Rico's leadership and together with José S. Alegría (father of Ricardo Alegría) and Eugenio Font Suárez co-founded the Independence Association (Asociación Independentista).

José Coll y Cuchí, who belonged to the Union Party of Puerto Rico, felt that the Union Party was not doing enough for the cause of Puerto Rican independence and together with his followers quit the party and founded the Nationalist Association of Puerto Rico (Asociación Nacionalista de Puerto Rico) in San Juan in 1919.

The Nationalist Youth was then composed of students from the University of Puerto Rico and High School students.

On September 17, 1922, the Independence Association merged with Coll y Cuchí's Nationalist Association of Puerto Rico and the Nationalist Youth (Juventud Nacionalista) political organizations to form the Puerto Rican Nationalist Party.

Further reading 
José Trías Monge, Puerto Rico: The Trials of the Oldest Colony in the World (Yale University Press, 1997)

References
 

Defunct political parties in Puerto Rico
Political parties established in 1920